Krux is a Swedish doom metal band formed by Leif Edling after Candlemass fell apart for the second time preceding their reunion tour.

Members 
 Leif Edling – bass (since 2002)
 Mats Levén – vocals (since 2002)
 Peter Stjärnvind – drums (since 2002)
 Jörgen Sandström – guitars (since 2002)
 Fredrik Åkesson – guitars (since 2002)
 Carl Westholm – keyboards (since 2002)

Discography 
 Krux (2002)
 Krux: Live (DVD, 2003)
 II (2006)
 III: He Who Sleeps Amongst the Stars (2011)

External links 
 Official homepage
 Official Myspace

Swedish doom metal musical groups
Musical groups established in 2002
2002 establishments in Sweden